Lauderdale County Tomato Festival is an annual celebration of the tomato in Ripley, Lauderdale County, U.S.A.

In addition to a tomato contest and an attempt to break the record for the "World's Longest 'Mater Sandwich", festival events have included carnival rides, an exhibit of "special treasures",  and a display of antique cards.....tomatoes are thrown to each other's face

History
The festival began in 1984, being held at the town square. Events have included local talent, tomato tasting, and fun activities for children. 36 years later, the first fest casualty occurred: the COVID-19 pandemic caused officials to scrap the festival & defer to 2021.

References
Memphis Flyer, issue 439, July 17, 1997 "Tomato Time – Vance finally pays a long-overdue visit to the Lauderdale County Tomato Festival."
Recipes from the Lauderdale County Tomato Festival, WREG-TV
Crafts Report, October 1999 – Food Festivals: A Mouth-Watering Alternative to the Craft Show Circuit
LakeReelfoot.com – Mississippi River Information

External links
Lauderdale Chamber – 2007 Lauderdale County Tomato Festival
CSS Internet's "Lauderdale County Home Page" – Information on previous Tomato Festivals

Tomatoes
Festivals in Tennessee
Tourist attractions in Lauderdale County, Tennessee
Food and drink festivals in the United States
Fruit festivals
Garden festivals in the United States